Sankt Ulrich am Waasen is a former municipality in the district of Leibnitz in Styria, Austria. Since the 2015 Styria municipal structural reform, has been part of the municipality Heiligenkreuz am Waasen.

References

Cities and towns in Leibnitz District